In automobile endurance racing, three events have come to form a Triple Crown. They are considered three of the most challenging endurance races over the decades: the 24 Hours of Daytona, 12 Hours of Sebring, and 24 Hours of Le Mans. As of 2023 only 9 drivers have completed the Triple Crown by winning all three races, Hans Herrmann was the first do so in 1970, and Timo Bernhard is the most recent to do so in 2010. No driver has won the three events in the same year. 

Ken Miles lost the chance to win all three events in the same year when a problem with the Ford team orders for a photo finish made him lose the 1966 24 Hours of Le Mans. This incident was dramatized in the 2019 film Ford v Ferrari. He died two months later testing the Ford J-car.

Hurley Haywood and Al Holbert have won the three races at least twice each.

Numerous drivers have won only two out of the three events.

Bold on year indicate at which race the driver achieved his Triple Crown.

References